Tim Hutchinson (born 1949) was a U.S. Senator from Arkansas from 1997 to 2003. Senator Hutchinson may also refer to:

Almanzor Hutchinson (1811–1893), New York State Senate
Buel Hutchinson (1826–1903), Wisconsin State Senate
Donald P. Hutchinson (born 1945), Maryland State Senate
Elijah C. Hutchinson (1855–1932), New Jersey State Senate
J. Edward Hutchinson (1914–1985), Michigan State Senate
Jeremy Hutchinson (politician) (born 1974), Arkansas State Senate
Scott Hutchinson (born 1961), Pennsylvania State Senate
Toi Hutchinson (born 1973), Illinois State Senate

See also
Senator Hutchison (disambiguation)
Joseph Collier Hutcheson (1906–1972), Virginia State Senate